Gigi's Recovery is the second studio album by Irish post-punk band the Murder Capital. The album was released via the band's own record label, Human Season Records, on 20 January 2023.

Singles
The lead single, "Only Good Things", was released on 20 July 2022. Three more singles, "A Thousand Lives", "Ethel", and "Return My Head", were also released in the lead up to the album's release.

Critical reception
Gigi's Recovery received a score of 85 out of 100 based on 11 critics' reviews on review aggregator Metacritic, indicating "universal acclaim".

Track listing

Personnel
 John Congleton – production, mixing
 Bernie Grundman – mastering
 Anthony Cazade – engineering
 Sammy Borst – engineering assistance
 Peter Doyle – artwork
 Aidan Cochrane – design
 Ashley Willerton – lettering

Charts

References

2023 albums
Albums produced by John Congleton
The Murder Capital albums